Mack 10 Presents Da Hood is the only collaborative studio album by American rappers Mack 10, Deviossi, Skoop Delania, K-Mac, Cousteau and Techniec (together known as Da Hood). It was released July 23, 2002 through D3 Entertainment with distribution via Riviera Entertainment. Production was handled by Young Tre, Leslie Brathwaite, Lil' Jon, Rashad Coes and Timbaland, with Mack 10 serving as executive producer. It features guest appearances from Ice Cube, Lil' Jon, Cash Money Millionaires and Timbaland. The album peaked at number 40 on the Billboard 200, at number 9 on the Top R&B/Hip-Hop Albums, and at number 2 on the Independent Albums in the United States.

Along with a single, a music video was released for the song "Hittin' Switches" and features cameo appearances by Stacey Dash and Layzie Bone.

Track listing

Charts

References

External links

2002 albums
Mack 10 albums
Collaborative albums
Albums produced by Lil Jon
Albums produced by Timbaland